This article details the qualifying phase for taekwondo at the 2024 Summer Olympics.  The competition at these Games will comprise a total of 128 taekwondo fighters coming from their respective NOCs; each can enter a maximum of eight taekwondo fighters, with one in each bodyweight category and four for each gender.

Host nation France reserves two men's and women's spots either through the WT Olympic Rankings or WT Grand Slam Champions Series, while four more places are entitled to the eligible NOCs interested to have their taekwondo practitioners compete in Paris 2024 through the Tripartite Commission Invitation. 

The remainder of the total quota will be attributed to the taekwondo fighters through a dual qualification pathway. Five quota places will be awarded to the top-ranked practitioners in each of the eight weight classes (four per gender) through the World Taekwondo (WT) Olympic Rankings, while the highest of each weight category on merit points standing will grant one quota place each for their respective NOC through the WT Grand Slam Champions Series, scheduled for December 16–17, 2023 in Wuxi, China. The NOC containing at least two female or male taekwondo fighters through the ranking is deemed ineligible to participate in the respective Continental Qualification Tournament unless it relinquishes the places obtained.

At the beginning of the 2024 season, five continental qualification tournaments will offer the majority of the berths to the top two taekwondo fighters of each weight category from Africa, the Americas, Asia, and Europe; and to the highest-ranked from Oceania.

Timeline

Qualification summary
The following table summarizes the qualification outcome for the taekwondo tournament at the 2024 Summer Olympics.

Men's events
Quota places are allocated to the respective NOC and not necessarily to the taekwondo practitioner achieving the place in the qualification event.

−58 kg

−68 kg

−80 kg

+80kg

Women's events
Quota places are allocated to the respective NOC and not necessarily to the taekwondo practitioner achieving the place in the qualification event.

−49 kg

−57 kg

−67 kg

+67 kg

Notes

References

 
Olympic Qualification
Olympic Qualification
Qualification
Qualification for the 2024 Summer Olympics
2024